Kesb (also Romanized as Kasb) is a village in Jowkar Rural District, Jowkar District, Malayer County, Hamadan Province, Iran. At the 2006 census, its population was 1,298, in 369 families.

References 

Populated places in Malayer County